Kieran Galvin (born 5 May 1966) is an Irish-born Australian film director and screenwriter. He wrote and directed four award-winning short films (The Burning Boy, Bad Ass Mono-Winged Angel, Contact, Other People), before he made his debut feature film (as writer and director), Puppy in 2005. Also in 2005 he was commissioned to write the thriller Feed for American film director Brett Leonard (Virtuosity, Lawnmower Man, Man-Thing). He is an atheist. In 2017, his first novel Five Monkeys; Gender Bending Suspense, Sex & Satire, was published by Double Five Books.

References

External links
 Keran Galvin Official Website

Australian atheists
Australian film directors
Australian screenwriters
Irish emigrants to Australia
Living people
1966 births
21st-century Australian novelists
21st-century Australian screenwriters